The malonic ester synthesis is a chemical reaction where diethyl malonate or another ester of malonic acid is alkylated at the carbon alpha (directly adjacent) to both carbonyl groups, and then converted to a substituted acetic acid. The major drawback of malonic ester synthesis is that the alkylation stage can also produce dialkylated structures. This makes separation of products difficult and yields lower.

Mechanism
The carbons alpha to carbonyl groups can be deprotonated by a strong base. The carbanion formed can undergo nucleophilic substitution on the alkyl halide, to give the alkylated compound. On heating, the di-ester undergoes thermal decarboxylation, yielding an acetic acid substituted by the appropriate R group. Thus, the malonic ester can be thought of being equivalent to the −CH2COOH synthon.

The esters chosen are usually the same as the base used, i.e. ethyl esters with sodium ethoxide. This is to prevent scrambling by transesterification.

Variations

Dialkylation

The ester may be dialkylated if deprotonation and alkylation are repeated before the addition of aqueous acid.

Cycloalkylcarboxylic acid synthesis

Intramolecular malonic ester synthesis occurs when reacted with a dihalide. This reaction is also called the Perkin alicyclic synthesis (see: alicyclic compound) after investigator William Henry Perkin, Jr.

Application 
In the manufacture of medicines, malonic ester is used for the synthesis of barbiturates, as well as sedatives and anticonvulsants.

Used in organic synthesis.

Аs a flavoring agent in the food industry.

See also
 Knoevenagel condensation
 Acetoacetic ester synthesis

References

Carbon-carbon bond forming reactions
Substitution reactions